The 2000 globemegawheels.com Grand Prix of Mosport was an American Le Mans Series professional sports car race held at Mosport International Raceway near Bowmanville, Ontario, Canada from August 4 to the 6, 2000. It was the sixth round of the 2000 American Le Mans Series season and the 15th IMSA / Professional SportsCar Racing sanctioned sports car race held at the facility.

Race
The overall race was won by Audi Sport North America's Audi R8 driven by Rinaldo Capello and Allan McNish for their second successive American Le Mans Series win of the season. The race was one of the closest races in sportscar racing history with the second place BMW V12 LMR driven by Jörg Müller and JJ Lehto for BMW Schnitzer Motorsport only 0.149 seconds behind at the finish. The #43 BMW V12 LMR driven by Jean-Marc Gounon and Bill Auberlen finished third. 

The race victory in the GTS class was equally as close with the Viper Team Oreca Dodge Viper GTS-R
of Olivier Beretta and Karl Wendlinger beating the local favorite Ron Fellows and his teammate Andy Pilgrim in the Corvette Racing Chevrolet Corvette C5-R by 0.29 seconds.

The GT class victory went Alex Job Racing drivers Randy Pobst and Bruno Lambert in the Porsche 911 GT3-R.

After two sunny days for practice and qualifying, the race was held under cool rainy conditions which led to five caution periods over 23 laps.  The race was broadcast across North America on NBC Sports with Allen Bestwick and Bill Adam calling the race.

Official results
Class winners in bold.

Statistics
 Pole Position - #78 Audi Sport North America - 1:08.432
 Fastest Lap - #77 Audi Sport North America - 1:11.424
 Time of race - 2:46:05.662
 Distance - 371.993 km
 Average Speed - 134.379 km/h

References

External links
2000 Grand Prix of Mosport Race Broadcast (YouTube)

Mosport
Grand Prix of Mosport
Grand Prix of Mosport
20000806